Christopher Aubrey Reginald Severn (born Los Angeles) is an American former screen actor.

Severn is the son of Dr. Clifford Brill Severn (1890-1981). His parents had emigrated from South Africa to Los Angeles shortly before he was born. He had seven siblings who were all child actors: Venetia Severn, Clifford Severn, Yvonne Severn, Raymond Severn, Ernest Severn, William Severn and Winston Severn.

Christopher Severn made his first film appearance as Mrs. Miniver's younger son Toby in Mrs. Miniver.  He and his brothers Ernest and Raymond all acted in the 1943 film The Man from Down Under.

Filmography

References

External links
 

American male film actors
Living people
Year of birth missing (living people)